Ctenolepis is a plant genus in the family Cucurbitaceae.

Species
The Plant List recognises 3 accepted species:
 Ctenolepis cerasiformis  
 Ctenolepis garcini  
 Ctenolepis lucorum

References

Cucurbitoideae
Cucurbitaceae genera
Taxa named by Joseph Dalton Hooker